Jonathan Hampton (1712 - 1 November 1777) was an American colonial surveyor, merchant, and militia officer involved with New Jersey's frontier fortifications and defenses along the Delaware River during the French and Indian War (1755-1763).

In 1755, the Royal Governor Jonathan Belcher and the colonial legislature authorized the construction of stone blockhouse fortifications along the colony's Delaware River frontier to thwart violent incursions by disaffected Native Americans and their French allies as hostilities led to the French and Indian War.  These incursions and other hostilities were a continuation of a European conflict between France and England called the Seven Years' War.  The act authorizing these fortifications also appointed Jonathan Hampton as the victualler and paymaster of a military unit, the New Jersey Frontier Guard, to man these forts.  To supply these troops, Hampton built the Military Road linking the provincial capital at Elizabethtown (now Elizabeth) with Morristown and the Delaware River valley (then called the Minisink) in 1756-1757.  This road followed Native American trails and became the route of subsequent roads, including the Union Turnpike, and present-day New Jersey Route 10, U.S. Route 206, and County Route 510.  The Military Road's western terminus ends at the Old Mine Road, an old road following the Delaware and Neversink River valleys between Esopus (now Kingston) in Ulster County, New York, and the Delaware Water Gap. Hampton established a large headquarters fort, Fort Johns, on the hillside overlooking the "Shapanack Flats" section of the Delaware valley near the Van Campen's Inn in Walpack Township.

Hampton owned many large tracts of land in Sussex County's Paulins Kill valley.  Shortly after the creation of the county, Hampton offered several acres from these tracts to the county for the building of a courthouse (built 1762-1765) and a public green. Nearby, he offered tracts for a proposed school, and to the Anglican church for a church and parsonage for the local rector.

Hampton was a freemason, however, he is often incorrectly conflated with the Jonathan Hampton of New York City that donated the altar bible, now known as the George Washington Inaugural Bible, to St. John's Lodge No. 1 after a fire in 1770.  Hampton was part of a group of petitioners to the Grand Lodge of Massachusetts in 1762 who had applied to form a lodge at Elizabethtown, New Jersey.  This petition was granted on January 24, 1762 with the lodge becoming Temple Lodge No. 1.

Hampton died 1 November 1777 in Elizabethtown, New Jersey allegedly while celebrating news of the surrender of Burgoyne at Saratoga two weeks earlier.

The Sussex County municipality of Hampton Township was named in his honor.

References

1712 births
1777 deaths
American Freemasons
Colonial American merchants
American surveyors
History of Sussex County, New Jersey
Paulins Kill watershed
People of New Jersey in the French and Indian War
People from Sussex County, New Jersey
People of colonial New Jersey